The following is a list of notable alumni and faculty of the University of Leipzig.

Notable alumni

 Theodore Dyke Acland, English physician
 Georgius Agricola, Saxon mining engineer and natural philosopher
 Joseph L. Armstrong, American scholar
 Jan Niecisław Baudouin de Courtenay, Polish linguist and slavist
 Kamuran Alî Bedirxan, Kurdish politician and writer
 Lothar Bisky, German politician
 Felix Bloch, Swiss physicist, Nobel Prize in Physics
 Marc Bloch, French historian
 John Bohnius, German physician
 Hjalmar Hjorth Boyesen, American writer and scholar
 Tycho Brahe, Danish astronomer
 Sylvia Bretschneider (1960-2019), politician, member and speaker of the state assembly (Landtag) of Mecklenburg-Vorpommern
 Selig Brodetsky, President of the Hebrew University of Jerusalem
 Cai Yuanpei, Chinese linguist
 James McKeen Cattell, American psychologist
 Wei-Liang Chow, Chinese mathematician and stamp collector born in Shanghai, known for his work in algebraic geometry.
 Constantine I, Greek monarch
 William David Coolidge, American physicist
 Karl Ludwig Drobisch (1803–1854), German composer, music theorist and church musician
 Georg Dohrn, German conductor
 Carl H. Dorner, American politician
 Ernst Christoph Dressler, German composer and music theorist
 Émile Durkheim, French sociologist
 Friedrich Adolf Ebert, Saxon librarian
 Johann Arnold Ebert, Saxon writer and translator
 Wilhelm Ehmann, musicologist, conductor, founder and director of the Herford School of Church Music
 Ephraim Emerton, American medievalist historian
 John O. Evjen, American theologian and church historian
 Gustav Fechner, German psychologist
 Wilhelm Fuchs (1898–1947), Nazi SS officer and Holocaust perpetrator executed for war crimes
 Arnold Gehlen, German philosopher and sociologist
 Hans-Dietrich Genscher, German politician
 Kurt Albert Gerlach, German sociologist
 Johann Wolfgang Goethe, German poet
 Woldemar Ludwig Grenser, German obstetrician
 Otto von Guericke, German scientist and politician
 Gotthard Günther, German-American philosopher
 Samuel Hahnemann, founder of homeopathy
 Edith Hamilton, American essayist and educator; first female student at the university together with her sister Alice
 Albert Hauck, German theologian and church historian
 Elsa Herrmann (1893–1957), Jewish German feminist writer and refugee advocate
 Johann Adam Hiller, Saxon composer
 Milton W. Humphreys, American scholar
 Adolf Hurwitz, German mathematician
 Edmund Husserl, Austrian philosopher and mathematician
 Ulrich von Hutten, Hessian humanist and political leader
 Nicolae Iorga, Romanian historian and politician
 Wolfgang Iser, German literary theorist
 Jan Jesenius, Slovak physician, politician and philosopher
 Tomas Garrigue Masaryk, founder and first president of Czechoslovakia, professor of sociology
 Uwe Johnson, German writer and translator
 Ernst Jünger, German novelist and nationalist activist
 Erich Kähler, German mathematician
 Erich Kästner, German satirist and children's writer
 Paul Kirchhoff, German anthropologist and ethnohistorian
 Johannes Knolleisen, German theologian
 Alexander Kohut, Hungarian-American rabbi and orientalist
 Ku Hung-ming, Malaysian-Chinese scholar
 Victor Lange, German-American linguist
 Georg Christian Lehms, German poet and novelist
 Gottfried Wilhelm Leibniz, German mathematician and philosopher
 August Leskien, German linguist
 Gotthold Ephraim Lessing, German philosopher and writer
 Rudolf Leuckart, German zoologist
 Karl Liebknecht, German communist activist
 Ulrike Liedtke (born 1958), musicologist and politician (SPD)
 Lin Yutang, Chinese novelist and inventor
 Virgil Madgearu, Romanian economist and sociologist
 Bronisław Malinowski, Polish anthropologist
 Sándor Márai, Hungarian poet and novelist
 Emil Mattiesen (1875–1939), composer, pianist and philosopher
 Thomas Mauksch, Lutheran pastor and naturalist
 Angela Merkel, German politician
 Walter Miller, American philologist
 Thomas Müntzer, Thuringian theologian and rebellion leader
 Carl Friedrich Naumann, German mineralogist and geologist
 Friedrich Nietzsche, German philosopher
 Novalis, German writer and philosopher
 Otto Ohlendorf (1907–1951), SS general and Holocaust perpetrator, executed for war crimes
 George Pardee, American physician and politician
 Lucrețiu Pătrășcanu, Romanian Marxist sociologist and politician
 James Phelan, Jr., American politician
 Samuel Pufendorf, German jurist and historian
 Jeff Radebe African politician and cabinet member
 Alexander Radishchev, Russian political thinker
 Constantin Rădulescu-Motru, Romanian psychologist and philosopher
 Hermann Raster, German-American journalist and political figure
 Augustus Quirinus Rivinus (1827–1891), German botanist and physician
 Ferdinand de Saussure, Swiss linguist
 Hans Ulrich von Schaffgotsch, Silesian nobleman and general
 Ludwig Scheeffer, German mathematician
 Helmut Schelsky, German sociologist
 Hans-Joachim Schulze, German Bach scholar 
 Kurt Schumacher, German politician
 Robert Schumann, German composer
 Georg Philipp Telemann, German composer
 Edward Teller, Hungarian-American nuclear physicist
 Galsan Tschinag, Mongolian writer, poet and activist
 Kārlis Ulmanis, Latvian politician
 Dimitri Uznadze, Georgian psychologist
 Richard Wagner, German composer
 Ernst Heinrich Weber, German physician
 Carl Friedrich von Weizsäcker, German physicist and philosopher
 Gustav Zeuner, German physicist and engineer
 Caspar Ziegler, jurist

Notable faculty
 Ernst Bloch, philosopher
 Felix Bloch, physicist, winner of the Nobel Prize in Physics in 1952
 Ludwig Boltzmann, Professor of Physics
 Karl Brugmann, comparative linguist
 Karl Bücher, economist
 Ernst Adolf Coccius, ophthalmologist
 Peter Debye, physicist, 1927-1936 Director of the Physics Institute, winner of the Nobel Prize in Chemistry in 1936
Adolf Ebert, Romance philologist
 Gustav Fechner, psychologist
 Paul Flechsig, neurologist
 Hans Freyer, sociologist
 Christian Fürchtegott Gellert, theologian and poet
 Ludwig Wilhelm Gilbert, publisher of the Annalen der Physik
 Rudolf Gottschall, critic, poet and dramatist
 Johann Christoph Gottsched, philologist
 Samuel Hahnemann, physician and lecturer at medical faculty 1812-21
 Werner Heisenberg, physicist, 1927–1942; Professor of Theoretical Physics; winner of the Nobel Prize in Physics in 1932
 Gustav Ludwig Hertz, physicist, 1954–1961; Head of the Physics Institute; winner of the Nobel Prize in Physics in 1925, together with James Franck
 Felix Klein, mathematician
 Werner Krauss, Romanist
 Karl Lamprecht, historian
 August Leskien, linguist
 Julius Edgar Lilienfeld, inventor of the transistor
 Wilhelm Maurenbrecher, historian
 August Ferdinand Möbius, astronomer and mathematician
 Theodor Mommsen, historian, 1848-1851 Professor of Law; Nobel Prize in Literature in 1902 for The History of Rome
 Petrus Mosellanus, Greek scholar
 Wilhelm Ostwald, chemist; 1887-1906 Chair of Physical Chemistry; Nobel Prize in Chemistry in 1909
 Svante Pääbo, Noble prize in Medicine, currently teaches molecular evolutionary biology at the university
 Martin Petzoldt, systematic theology; president of the Neue Bachgesellschaft
 Augustus Quirinus Rivinus, botanist
 Wilhelm Roscher, economist
 Carl Victor Ryssel, theologian
 Heinrich Simroth, zoologist
 Nathan Söderblom, religious historian; Director of the Religious Studies Institute 1912–1914; Nobel Peace Prize in 1930
 Georg Steindorff, egyptologist
 Christian Thomasius, philosopher
 Sin-Itiro Tomonaga, physicist, winner of the Nobel Prize in Physics in 1965
 Wolfgang Unger, director of university music
 Bartel Leendert van der Waerden, mathematician
 Ernst Heinrich Weber, physician
 Peter Wollny, musicologist
 Wilhelm Wundt, physician, psychologist
 Paul Zweifel, physician, physiologist

Universitätsmusikdirektor 
Several persons held the official title of director of music at the university, some of them at the same time Thomaskantor, including:
 
 Werner Fabricius
 Johann Gottlieb Görner
 Hermann Grabner
 
 Johann Adam Hiller (Thomaskantor 1789–1800)
 Hermann Kretzschmar
 Johann Kuhnau (Thomaskantor 1701–1722)
 
 
 Max Pommer
 Friedrich Rabenschlag
 Max Reger
 Ernst Friedrich Richter (Thomaskantor 1868–1879)
 Hans-Joachim Rotzsch (Thomaskantor 1972–1991)
 Johann Schelle (Thomaskantor 1677–1701)
 Johann Gottfried Schicht (Thomaskantor 1811–1823)
 Friedrich Schneider
 Johann Philipp Christian Schulz
 David Timm
 Wolfgang Unger (Thomaskantor interim 1991–1992)
 Heinrich Zöllner

References

Leipzig
Leipzig University